Borovac is a Serbo-Croatian toponym, derived from bor, "pine tree", literally meaning "place of pines". It may refer to:

 Borovac (Banovići), a village in Bosnia and Herzegovina
 Borovac (Rogatica), a village in Bosnia and Herzegovina
 Borovac (Sokolac), a village in Bosnia and Herzegovina
 Borovac (Višegrad), a village in Bosnia and Herzegovina
 Borovac (Bujanovac), a village in Serbia
 Borovac, Medveđa, a village in Serbia
 Borovac (Zaječar), a village in Serbia
 Borovac, Croatia, a village near Novska
 Borovac (Goražde), a mountain Jahorina's peak near Goražde in Bosnia and Herzegovina

Serbo-Croatian place names